Language change is variation over time in a language's  features. It is studied in several subfields of linguistics: historical linguistics, sociolinguistics, and evolutionary linguistics. Traditional theories of historical linguistics identify three main types of change: systematic change in the pronunciation of phonemes, or sound change; borrowing, in which features of a language or dialect are altered as a result of influence from another language or dialect; and analogical change, in which the shape or grammatical behavior of a word is altered to more closely resemble that of another word.

All living languages are continually undergoing change. Some commentators use derogatory labels such as "corruption" to suggest that language change constitutes a degradation in the quality of a language, especially when the change originates from human error or is a prescriptively discouraged usage. Modern linguistics rejects this concept, since from a scientific point of view such innovations cannot be judged in terms of good or bad. John Lyons notes that "any standard of evaluation applied to language-change must be based upon a recognition of the various functions a language 'is called upon' to fulfil in the society which uses it".

Causes
 Economy: Speech communities tend to change their utterances to be as efficient and effective (with as little effort) as possible, while still reaching communicative goals. Purposeful speaking therefore involves a trade-off of costs and benefits.
 The principle of least effort tends to result in phonetic reduction of speech forms. See vowel reduction, cluster reduction, lenition, and elision. After some time a change may become widely accepted (it becomes a regular sound change) and may end up treated as standard.
 Expressiveness: Common or overused language tends to lose its emotional or rhetorical intensity over time; therefore, new words and constructions are continuously employed to revive that intensity
 Analogy: Over time, speech communities unconsciously apply patterns of rules in certain words, sounds, etc. to unrelated other words, sounds, etc.
 Language contact: Words and constructions are borrowed from one language into another.
 Cultural environment: As a culture evolves, new places, situations, and objects inevitably enter its language, whether or not the culture encounters different people.
 Migration/Movement: Speech communities, moving into a region with a new or more complex linguistic situation, will influence, and be influenced by, language change; they sometimes even end up with entirely new languages, such as pidgins and creoles.
 Imperfect learning: According to one view, children regularly learn the adult forms imperfectly, and the changed forms then turn into a new standard. Alternatively, imperfect learning occurs regularly in one part of society, such as an immigrant group, where the minority language forms a substratum, and the changed forms can ultimately influence majority usage.
 Social prestige: Language may not only change towards features that have more social prestige, but also away from ones with negative prestige, as in the case of the loss of rhoticity in the British Received Pronunciation accent. Such movements can go back and forth.

According to Guy Deutscher, the tricky question is "Why are changes not brought up short and stopped in their tracks? At first sight, there seem to be all the reasons in the world why society should never let the changes through." He sees the reason for tolerating change in the fact that we already are used to "synchronic variation", to the extent that we are hardly aware of it. For example, when we hear the word "wicked", we automatically interpret it as either "evil" or "wonderful", depending on whether it is uttered by an elderly lady or a teenager. Deutscher speculates that "[i]n a hundred years' time, when the original meaning of 'wicked' has all but been forgotten, people may wonder how it was ever possible for a word meaning 'evil' to change its sense to 'wonderful' so quickly."

Types

Phonetic and phonological changes

Sound change—i.e., change in the pronunciation of phonemes—can lead to phonological change (i.e., change in the relationships between phonemes within the structure of a language). For instance, if the pronunciation of one phoneme changes to become identical to that of another phoneme, the two original phonemes can merge into a single phoneme, reducing the total number of phonemes the language contains.

Determining the exact course of sound change in historical languages can pose difficulties, inasmuch as the technology of sound recording dates only from the 19th century, and thus sound changes before that time must be inferred from written texts. The orthographical practices of historical writers provide the main (indirect) evidence of how language sounds have changed over the centuries.  Poetic devices such as rhyme and rhythm can also provide clues to earlier phonetic and phonological patterns.

A principal axiom of historical linguistics, established by the linguists of the Neogrammarian school of thought in the 19th century, is that sound change is said to be "regular"—i.e., a given sound change simultaneously affects all words in which the relevant set of phonemes appears, rather than each word's pronunciation changing independently of each other. The degree to which the Neogrammarian hypothesis is an accurate description of how sound change takes place, rather than a useful approximation, is controversial; but it has proven extremely valuable to historical linguistics as a heuristic, and enabled the development of methodologies of comparative reconstruction and internal reconstruction that allow linguists to extrapolate backward from known languages to the properties of earlier, unattested languages and hypothesize sound changes that may have taken place in them.

Lexical changes
The study of lexical changes forms the diachronic portion of the science of onomasiology.

The ongoing influx of new words into the English language (for example) helps make it a rich field for investigation into language change, despite the difficulty of defining precisely and accurately the vocabulary available to speakers of English. Throughout its history English has not only borrowed words from other languages but has re-combined and recycled them to create new meanings, whilst losing some old words.

Dictionary-writers try to keep track of the changes in languages by recording (and, ideally, dating) the appearance in a language of new words, or of new usages for existing words. By the same token, they may tag some words eventually as "archaic" or "obsolete".

Spelling changes

Standardisation of spelling originated centuries ago. Differences in spelling often catch the eye of a reader of a text from a previous century.  The pre-print era had fewer literate people: languages lacked fixed systems of orthography, and the handwritten manuscripts that survive often show words spelled according to regional pronunciation and to personal preference.

Semantic changes

Semantic changes are shifts in the meanings of existing words. Basic types of semantic change include:
 pejoration, in which a term's connotations become more negative
 amelioration, in which a term's connotations become more positive
 broadening, in which a term acquires additional potential uses
 narrowing, in which a term's potential uses are restricted

After a word enters a language, its meaning can change as through a shift in the valence of its connotations. As an example, when "villain" entered English it meant 'peasant' or 'farmhand', but acquired the connotation 'low-born' or 'scoundrel', and today only the negative use survives. Thus 'villain' has undergone pejoration. Conversely, the word "wicked" is undergoing amelioration in colloquial contexts, shifting from its original sense of 'evil', to the much more positive one  of 'brilliant'.

Words' meanings may also change in terms of the breadth of their semantic domain. Narrowing a word limits its alternative meanings, whereas broadening associates new meanings with it. For example, "hound" (Old English hund) once referred to any dog, whereas in modern English it denotes only a particular type of dog. On the other hand, the word "dog" itself has been broadened from its Old English root 'dogge', the name of a particular breed, to become the general term for all domestic canines.

Syntactic change

Syntactic change is the evolution of the syntactic structure of a natural language.

Over time, syntactic change is the greatest modifier of a particular language. Massive changes – attributable either to creolization or to relexification – may occur both in syntax and in vocabulary. Syntactic change can also be purely language-internal, whether independent within the syntactic component or the eventual result of phonological or morphological change.

Sociolinguistics
The sociolinguist Jennifer Coates, following William Labov, describes linguistic change as occurring in the context of linguistic heterogeneity. She explains that "[l]inguistic change can be said to have taken place when a new linguistic form, used by some sub-group within a speech community, is adopted by other members of that community and accepted as the norm."

The sociolinguist William Labov recorded the change in pronunciation in a relatively short period in the American resort of Martha's Vineyard and showed how this resulted from social tensions and processes.
Even in the relatively short time that broadcast media have recorded their work, one can observe the difference between the pronunciation of the newsreaders of the 1940s and the 1950s and the pronunciation of today. The greater acceptance and fashionability of regional accents in  media may also reflect a more democratic, less formal society — compare the widespread adoption of language policies.

Can and Patton (2010) provide a quantitative analysis of twentieth-century Turkish literature using forty novels of forty authors. Using weighted least squares regression and a sliding window approach, they show that, as time passes, words, in terms of both tokens (in text) and types (in vocabulary), have become longer. They indicate that the increase in word lengths with time can be attributed to the government-initiated language "reform" of the 20th century. This reform aimed at replacing foreign words used in Turkish, especially Arabic- and Persian-based words (since they were in majority when the reform was initiated in early 1930s), with newly coined pure Turkish neologisms created by adding suffixes to Turkish word stems (Lewis, 1999).

Can and Patton (2010), based on their observations of the change of a specific word use (more specifically in newer works the preference of ama over fakat, both borrowed from Arabic and meaning "but", and their inverse usage correlation is statistically significant), also speculate that the word length increase can influence the common word choice preferences of authors.

Kadochnikov (2016) analyzes the political and economic logic behind the development of the Russian language. Ever since the emergence of the unified Russian state in the 15th and 16th centuries the government played a key role in standardizing the Russian language and developing its prescriptive norms with the fundamental goal of ensuring that it can be efficiently used as a practical tool in all sorts of legal, judicial, administrative and economic affairs throughout the country.

Quantification
Altintas, Can, and Patton (2007) introduce a systematic approach to language change quantification by studying unconsciously used language features in time-separated parallel translations. For this purpose, they use objective style markers such as vocabulary richness and lengths of words, word stems and suffixes, and employ statistical methods to measure their changes over time.

Language shift and social status

Languages perceived to be "higher status" stabilise or spread at the expense of other languages perceived by their own speakers to be "lower-status".

Historical examples are the early Welsh and Lutheran Bible translations, leading to the liturgical languages Welsh and High German thriving today, unlike other Celtic or German variants.

For prehistory, Forster and Renfrew (2011) argue that in some cases there is a correlation of language change with intrusive male Y chromosomes but not with female mtDNA. They then speculate that technological innovation (transition from hunting-gathering to agriculture, or from stone to metal tools) or military prowess (as in the abduction of British women by Vikings to Iceland) causes immigration of at least some males, and perceived status change. Then, in mixed-language marriages with these males, prehistoric women would often have chosen to transmit the "higher-status" spouse's language to their children, yielding the language/Y-chromosome correlation seen today.

See also
 Calque
 Dialect continuum
 Grammaticalization
 Koiné language
 Language transfer
 Morphemization
 Neologism
 Origin of language
 Phono-semantic matching
 Wave model (linguistics)

Notes

References
Journals

Books
 
 Labov, William (1994, 2001), Principles of Linguistic Change (vol.I Internal Factors, 1994; vol.II Social Factors, 2001), Blackwell.
 Lewis, G. (1999). The Turkish Language Reform: A Catastrophic Success. Oxford : Oxford University Press.
 Wardhaugh, R. (1986), An Introduction to Sociolinguistics, Oxford/ New York.

Further reading 
 AlBader, Yousuf B. (2015) "Semantic Innovation and Change in Kuwaiti Arabic: A Study of the Polysemy of Verbs"
 Hale, M. (2007), Historical linguistics: Theory and method, Oxford, Blackwell

External links
 Sounds Familiar? The British Library website provides audio examples of  changing accents and dialects from across the UK.

Historical linguistics
Sociolinguistics